Margaret Judith Ann Peterlin (born October 9, 1970) is an American lawyer, United States Navy veteran, and former Commerce Department and congressional aide. She was the Chief of Staff to the United States Secretary of State, appointed to the position by former Secretary of State Rex Tillerson, from February 2017 until the end of March 2018. Since July 6, 2018, she has served as the senior vice president of global external and public affairs for AT&T.

Early life and education
Peterlin is a native of Daleville, Alabama. She obtained a Bachelor of Arts in political science from the College of the Holy Cross in 1993, when she was commissioned into the Navy through the Reserve Officer Training Corps. Peterlin graduated cum laude from the University of Chicago Law School in 2000. She was the founder and first editor-in-chief of the Chicago Journal of International Law.

Career

Federal clerkship 
After graduating from law school, Peterlin clerked for Judge Jerry Edwin Smith, of the U.S. Court of Appeals for the 5th Circuit, from 2000 to 2001.

United States Navy
Peterlin served as a Command Administrative Officer and a Communications Officer in the United States Navy  She was selected to serve as a White House Social Aide, and was awarded the Navy Commendation Medal and Navy Achievement Medal.

Capitol Hill
In mid-2001, Peterlin joined the staff of House Majority Leader Dick Armey, working as his Counsel for Legal Policy and National Security Advisor, and later served as National Security Advisor for House Speaker Dennis Hastert. She helped draft the Authorization for the Use of Military Force in Afghanistan and the Patriot Act, as well as the legislation establishing the United States Department of Homeland Security.

Commerce Department
Peterlin worked at the United States Patent and Trademark Office, an agency of the United States Department of Commerce, serving as its Deputy Director, as well as the Deputy Under Secretary of Commerce for Intellectual Property.

Private sector
After leaving government service, Peterlin worked as a technology strategy officer at Mars, and later served as Chief Executive Officer of Profectus Global Corp., a small advisory firm located in Arlington, Virginia. Prior to joining the Department of State, Peterlin was Managing Director at XLP Capital, a Boston-based technology consulting firm, a role she began in November 2015.

State Department
Peterlin was initially chosen by President-elect Donald Trump's transition team to help Rex Tillerson during the Senate confirmation process. She developed a rapport with Tillerson, who invited her to serve as his chief of staff. According to press accounts, Peterlin has been described as a "fierce gatekeeper." She has also helped to impose sharp restrictions on both the media's and State Department staffers' access to Tillerson.

Peterlin left the State Department effective March 31, 2018, following the firing of Secretary Tillerson.

References

External links

1970 births
American lawyers
College of the Holy Cross alumni
Living people
People from Daleville, Alabama
United States Department of Commerce officials
United States Department of State officials
United States Navy officers
University of Chicago Law School alumni